The  is one of the oldest art museums in Japan.  It is located in Okazaki Park in Sakyō-ku, Kyoto, and opened in 1928 as a commemoration of Emperor Hirohito's coronation ceremony as it was initially called the Shōwa Imperial Coronation Art Museum of Kyoto.

Important works in the collection

Takeuchi Seihō: 芙蓉 (1882), 年中行事 (1886), 池塘浪静 (1887), 雲龍 (1887), 遊鯉 (1887), 宇野老人像 (1895), 渓山秋月 (1899), 散華 (1910), 散華 (1910), 熊 (1910), 雨 (1911), 絵になる最初 (1913), 金魚の句(1913), 潮沙永日 (1922), 酔興 (1924), 馬に乗る狐 (1924), うな辺 (1926), 雷公 (1930), 松 (1932), 水村 (1934), 風竹野 (1934), 風竹 (1934), 驟雨一過 (1935), 静閑 (1935), 雄風 (1940), 色紙十二ヶ月(1926–41), 八功徳水,冬瓜にねずみ

Building information
Planning: Kenjirō Maeda
Completion of construction: 1933
Total floor space: 9,349m²
Full address: 〒606-8344　京都府京都市左京区岡崎円勝寺町124

Access
Kyoto Municipal Subway Tozai Line
Higashiyama Station
Kyoto City Bus 
Okazaki Koen / Bijutsukan, Heian Jingu-mae stop (Route 5, 46, 100, 110 and Kyoto Okazaki Loop)
Okazaki Koen / ROHM Theatre Kyoto, Miyakomesse-mae stop (Route 32)

Surroundings

The National Museum of Modern Art, Kyoto
Kyoto Municipal Zoo
Heian Shrine
ROHM Theatre Kyoto

Kyoto Prefectural Library
Chion-in

References

External links

Art museums established in 1933
Art museums and galleries in Japan
Museums in Kyoto
1933 establishments in Japan